There are 16 radio stations in New Delhi of which 13 are broadcast in frequency modulation (FM) band. Of the 13 FM stations, 4 are broadcast by AIR. Three stations, all run by AIR, broadcast on the amplitude modulation (AM) medium wave (MW) band.

AM

Mediumwave

FM

References

AIR Prasar Bharati Stations List

Radio Stations
Delhi